The 1954 All-Ireland Minor Football Championship was the 23rd staging of the All-Ireland Minor Football Championship, the Gaelic Athletic Association's premier inter-county Gaelic football tournament for boys under the age of 18.

Mayo entered the championship as defending champions, however, they were defeated by Dublin in the All-Ireland semi-final.

On 26 September 1954, Dublin won the championship following a 3-3 to 1-8 defeat of Kerry in the All-Ireland final. This was their third All-Ireland title overall and their first in nine championship seasons.

Results

Connacht Minor Football Championship

Quarter-Final

Mayo 1-7 Sligo 0-2.

Semi-Finals

Sligo 2-3 Leitrim 0-8.

Galway 2-13 Mayo 3-5.

Final

Mayo beat Sligo.

Leinster Minor Football Championship

Munster Minor Football Championship

Ulster Minor Football Championship

All-Ireland Minor Football Championship

Semi-Finals

Dublin 3-13 Mayo 0-7. 

Final

References

1953
All-Ireland Minor Football Championship